Henry Clements may refer to:

 Henry Clements (1644–1696), Irish MP for Carrickfergus
 Henry Clements (1704–1745), Irish MP for Cavan
 Henry Theophilus Clements (1734–1795), Irish MP for Cavan and County Leitrim
 Henry John Clements (1781–1843), Irish MP for County Leitrim and County Cavan